The Mizque River (Quechua misk'i sweet) is a river of Bolivia in the Cochabamba Department. It is a tributary of Río Grande.

See also
List of rivers of Bolivia

Further reading
Rand McNally, The New International Atlas, 1993.

Rivers of Cochabamba Department